Winer Observatory is an astronomical observatory near Sonoita, Arizona in the United States. It is a private, non-profit observatory, operated by Mark Trueblood since 1983. It has been the site of a number of significant small telescopes and famous robotic telescopes. It has been the site of the Iowa Robotic Observatory. The facility also hosted Michael Schwartz's telescope, active in supernova patrols, until Tenagra Observatories opened a facility in the area. Is the site of the Kilodegree Extremely Little Telescope.

See also 
 List of observatories

References 

 

Astronomical observatories in Arizona
Buildings and structures in Santa Cruz County, Arizona